Lilia Maraviglia (Bulgarian: Лилия Маравиля; born 18 January 1969, in Varna) is a Bulgarian actress. She is married to Italian banker Luca Maraviglia (2001–present) and they have a daughter named Paola.

Filmography 

Film

TV

References 

1969 births
Living people
Actors from Varna, Bulgaria
Bulgarian film actresses
Bulgarian television actresses